The Rounders was an American Western-style sitcom about two cowboys on the fictitious J.L. Ranch in Texas.

Cast
Ron Hayes as Ben Jones
Chill Wills as Jim Ed Love
Patrick Wayne as Howdy Lewis

Episodes

References

External links 
 

1960s Western (genre) television series
American Broadcasting Company original programming
1960s American sitcoms
1966 American television series debuts
1967 American television series endings
Television shows set in Texas
Live action television shows based on films
English-language television shows
Television series by MGM Television